Homes Things (As Coisas lá de Casa) is a Portuguese animated children's series created by José Miguel Ribeiro.

Synopsis 
Short stories featuring by the objects and things you can find at home, accompanied by songs sung by two little girls.

Episodes 
 The television and the aerial
 The Vacuum Cleaner and the Rug
 The Bucket and the Mop
 The Cake and the Tin 
 The Boot and the Lace 
 The Umbrella and the Wellies
 The Light and the Switch 
 The Things Inside the Handbag 
 The Toothbrush and the Toothpaste
 The Knife and the Fork
 The Pencil and the Eraser
 The Books and the Bookcase 
 The Globe and the Magnifying Glass 
 The Nails and the Hammer 
 The Table and the Chairs 
 The Glasses and the Newspaper 
 The Brush and the Dust-pan 
 The Pan and the Whisk 
 The Two Pictures 
 The Clothes and the Pegs 
 The Telephone and the Directory                                                                                 
 The Scissors and the Needle 
 The Toaster and the Toast 
 The Candles and the Candlestick 
 The Tea-cups and the Cabinet 
 The Photos and the Album

References

External links 
 Website

Portuguese children's animated television series